Michał Jurecki (born 27 October 1984) is a Polish handball player for KS Azoty-Puławy.

Private life
His older brother Bartosz Jurecki is a former handball player and current manager. In 2007 Michał married to Joanna. They have daughter Oliwia, born on 6 September 2007. In 2015 his wife gave birth to their second daughter named Julia.

Career
He received a silver medal with the Polish team at the 2007 World Men's Handball Championship and a bronze medal in 2009 and in 2015. He participated at the 2008 Summer Olympics, where Poland finished fifth and at the 2016 Summer Olympics where Poland took fourth place. At the 2016 European Championship he was awarded All Star Left back of the tournament.

Achievements
PGE Vive Kielce
Polish Superliga: 2011–12, 2012–13, 2013–14, 2014–15, 2015–16, 2016–17, 2017–18, 2018–19
Cup of Poland: 2011, 2012, 2013, 2014, 2015, 2016, 2017, 2018, 2019
EHF Champions League: 2015–16

Individual
 2016 European Championship - All-Star Left back

State awards
 2007  Gold Cross of Merit
 2015  Knight's Cross of Polonia Restituta

References

External links
Profile

1984 births
Living people
People from Kościan
Sportspeople from Greater Poland Voivodeship
Polish male handball players
Olympic handball players of Poland
Handball players at the 2008 Summer Olympics
Handball players at the 2016 Summer Olympics
Vive Kielce players
Handball-Bundesliga players
Expatriate handball players
Polish expatriate sportspeople in Germany
TuS Nettelstedt-Lübbecke players
SG Flensburg-Handewitt players
21st-century Polish people